The Serra das Confusões National Park is a  national park in the state of Piauí, Brazil.

Geography

The Serra das Confusões National Park is in the municipalities of Alvorada do Gurguéia, Brejo do Piauí, Bom Jesus, Canto do Buriti, Caracol, Cristino Castro, Guaribas, Jurema, Santa Luz and Tamboril do Piauí in the state of Piauí.

Geomorphology 
The park lies in the Piauí-Maranhão sedimentary basin plateau, a section of the Parnaíba basin that has been uplifted. Bedrock geology is mostly sandstone and shale ranging from Devonian to Triassic origin.

The terrain is relatively flat, containing sandstone plateaus and adjacent depressions of the Parnaíba depression.
The lower portions are more rugged, with rocky outcrops holding small caves and springs of water.
The intermittent Itaueira River rises in the park.

Climate 

Ecology 
The park is in the Caatinga biome.
There are rainforest trees in the lower areas reaching  in height. 
The wetter valleys hold bromeliads and ferns with occasional giant trees.

13 of the 18 endemic Caatinga species of fauna have been identified.
Surveys have found three new species of lizard, one new amphibian and one new turtle.
Protected species in the park include the jaguar (Panthera onca), cougar (Puma concolor), giant armadillo (Priodontes maximus), Brazilian three-banded armadillo (Tolypeutes tricinctus), white-browed guan (Penelope jacucaca) and bearded bellbird (Procnias averano).

Administrative history

The Serra das Confusões National Park was created by federal decree on 2 October 1998, and is administered by the Chico Mendes Institute for Biodiversity Conservation.
The park is classed as IUCN protected area category II (national park).
The objective is to preserve a natural ecosystem of great ecological relevance and scenic beauty, and to support scientific research, environmental education and interpretation, outdoors recreation and ecotourism.
The Capivara-Confusões Ecological Corridor, created in 2006, links the park to the Serra da Capivara National Park.

Gallery

Notes

Sources

1998 establishments in Brazil
National parks of Brazil
Protected areas of Piauí
Caatinga